The Capture of Harput occurred in 1465 when Uzun Hasan attacked the territories of Melik Arslan and captured Harput.

When Melik Arslan attacked Kayseri, a possession of the Karamanids in 1464, the Karamanids requested help from the Aq Qoyunlu state. This situation created a gap between the Dulkadirids and the Aq Qoyunlu.

Uzun Hasan was looking for an opportunity to seize Harput which was held by the Dulkadirids. In 1465 he attacked the territories of Melik Arslan and captured Harput. Aq Qoyunlu rule over Harput lasted until 1507.

References

Battles of the Aq Qoyunlu